South Dakota's 2nd congressional district is an obsolete district. It was created after the 1910 census and was eliminated as a result of the redistricting cycle after the 1980 Census. Members were elected at-large until the formation of individual districts after the 1910 census. From 1913 until 1933, the 2nd district covered much of northeastern South Dakota, including the cities of Aberdeen, Brookings, Huron, and Watertown. When South Dakota's 3rd congressional district was eliminated after the 1930 census, the 2nd district was relocated to cover all of the counties in South Dakota west of the Missouri River. Population changes eventually moved the district's boundaries further east. During the 97th Congress, it covered all but the 21 easternmost counties in the state.

List of members representing the district

References

 Congressional Biographical Directory of the United States 1774–present

02
Former congressional districts of the United States
1913 establishments in South Dakota
1983 disestablishments in South Dakota
Constituencies established in 1913
Constituencies disestablished in 1983